John Arnold Lynch (1929 – 31 December 2018) was an Australian rules footballer who played with West Adelaide in the South Australian National Football League (SANFL) from 1948 until he retired after the 1958 season.

Lynch, a dashing wingman, started out at West Adelaide in 1948 by winning the Sam Sucking Medal as the club's best first year player and he went on to win West's Best & Fairest award in 1952. During his time with West Adelaide, Lynch played in three losing Grand Finals, all to Port Adelaide (1954, 1956 and 1958).

Lynch was also a strong performer at interstate level, representing South Australia in 16 matches and earning All-Australian selection at the 1953 Adelaide Carnival. In doing so Lynch became the first West Adelaide player to earn All-Australian selection. He also twice selected in the 'Sporting Life' Team of the Year.

Lynch retired from league football following the 1958 Grand Final loss to Port Adelaide. In his 11 seasons with the club he played 147 games and kicked 14 goals

Jack Lynch was an inaugural inductee into the West Adelaide Hall of Fame in 2005 and the following year he was inducted into the South Australian Football Hall of Fame.

References

External links
SA Football Hall of Fame - John Lynch

1929 births
2018 deaths
Australian rules footballers from South Australia
West Adelaide Football Club players
All-Australians (1953–1988)
South Australian Football Hall of Fame inductees